M13 is a Ukrainian international highway (M-highway) connecting Kropyvnytskyi to the border with Moldova, where before crossing the Dniester it heads towards Chişinău as the M1. The entire route is part of European route E584.

Main Route

Main route and connections to/intersections with other highways in Ukraine.

Note
Technically the route crosses Transnistria.

See also

 Roads in Ukraine
 Ukraine Highways
 International E-road network
 Pan-European corridors

References

External links
 International Roads in Ukraine in Russian
 European Roads in Russian

Roads in Odesa Oblast
Roads in Mykolaiv Oblast
Roads in Kirovohrad Oblast